"Over and Over Again" is a song by English singer Nathan Sykes. The song was written by Sykes, alongside Harmony Samuels, Carmen Reece and Major Johnson Finley, and was released in the United Kingdom on 18 October 2015 as the second single from his debut studio album Unfinished Business (2016). The song peaked at number eight on the UK Singles Chart. A remix featuring American singer Ariana Grande was also released as a single on 15 January 2016.

Live performances
Sykes performed the song live on The X Factor on 22 November 2015. He also performed a stripped-down version of the song on The Late Late Show with James Corden. He also sang a version of it at the 2016 Summertime Ball with Louisa Johnson.

Music video
A music video to accompany the release of "Over and Over Again" was first released onto YouTube on 28 October 2015.    It starred newcomer actress Maemae Renfrow of the future Nickelodeon show Hunter Street as the love interest.

Track listing

Charts

Weekly charts

Year-end charts

Release history

See also
 List of number-one dance singles of 2016 (U.S.)

References

2010s ballads
2015 singles
2015 songs
2016 singles
Ariana Grande songs
Nathan Sykes songs
Pop ballads
Songs written by Carmen Reece
Songs written by Harmony Samuels
Songs written by Nathan Sykes
Male–female vocal duets